Liberal arts education (from Latin  "free" and  "art or principled practice") is the traditional academic course in Western higher education. Liberal arts takes the term art in the sense of a learned skill rather than specifically the fine arts. Liberal arts education can refer to studies in a liberal arts degree course or to a university education more generally. Such a course of study contrasts with those that are principally vocational, professional, or technical, as well as religiously-based courses.

The term "liberal arts" for an educational curriculum dates back to classical antiquity in the West, but has changed its meaning considerably, mostly expanding it. The seven subjects in the ancient and medieval meaning came to be divided into the trivium of rhetoric, grammar, and logic, and the quadrivium of astronomy (often more astrology), mathematics, geometry, and music.  The modern sense of the term usually covers all the natural sciences, formal sciences, social sciences, arts, and humanities.

History
Before they became known by their Latin variations, the liberal arts were the continuation of Ancient Greek methods of enquiry that began with a "desire for a universal understanding." Pythagoras argued that there was a mathematical and geometrical harmony to the cosmos or the universe; his followers linked the four arts of astronomy, mathematics, geometry, and music into one area of study to form the "disciplines of the mediaeval quadrivium". In 4th-century-BC Athens, the government of the polis, or city-state, respected the ability of rhetoric or public speaking above almost everything else. Eventually rhetoric, grammar, and dialectic (logic) became the educational programme of the trivium. Together they came to be known as the seven liberal arts. Originally these subjects or skills were held by classical antiquity to be essential for a free person ("worthy of a free person") to acquire in order to take an active part in civic life, something that included among other things participating in public debate, defending oneself in court, serving on juries, and participating in military service. While the arts of the quadrivium might have appeared prior to the arts of the trivium, by the middle ages educational programmes taught the trivium (grammar, logic, and rhetoric) first while the quadrivium (arithmetic, geometry, music, astronomy) were the following stage of education.

Seneca the Younger discusses liberal arts in education from a critical Stoic point of view in Moral Epistles. The exact classification of the liberal arts varied however in Roman times, and it was only after Martianus Capella in the 5th century influentially brought the seven liberal arts as bridesmaids to the Marriage of Mercury and Philology, that they took on canonical form.

The four "scientific"  – music, arithmetic, geometry, and astronomy – were known from the time of Boethius onwards as the quadrivium. After the 9th century, the remaining three arts of the "humanities" – grammar, logic, and rhetoric – were grouped as the trivium. It was in that two-fold form that the seven liberal arts were studied in the medieval Western university. During the Middle Ages, logic gradually came to take predominance over the other parts of the trivium.

Their encyclopedia compiled ideas drawn from philosophy, theology, literature, music, arts, and sciences and was intended as a teaching tool for women of the abbey. The image Philosophy and seven liberal arts represents the circle of philosophy, and is presented as a rosette of a cathedral: a central circle and a series of semicircles arranged all around. Each of these arts find their source in the Greek φιλοσοφία, philosophia, literally “love of wisdom”. St. Albert the Great, a doctor of the Catholic Church, asserted that the seven liberal arts were referred to in Sacred Scripture, saying: "It is written, 'Wisdom hath built herself a house, she hath hewn her out seven pillars' (Proverbs 9:1). This house is the Blessed Virgin; the seven pillars are the seven liberal arts." 

In the Renaissance, the Italian humanists and their Northern counterparts, despite in many respects continuing the traditions of the Middle Ages, reversed that process. Re-christening the old trivium with a new and more ambitious name: , and also increasing its scope, they downplayed logic as opposed to the traditional Latin grammar and rhetoric, and added to them history, Greek, and moral philosophy (ethics), with a new emphasis on poetry as well. The educational curriculum of humanism spread throughout Europe during the sixteenth century and became the educational foundation for the schooling of European elites, the functionaries of political administration, the clergy of the various legally recognized churches, and the learned professions of law and medicine. The ideal of a liberal arts, or humanistic education grounded in classical languages and literature, persisted in Europe until the middle of the twentieth century; in the United States, it had come under increasingly successful attack in the late 19th century by academics interested in reshaping American higher education around the natural and social sciences.

Similarly, Wilhelm von Humboldt's educational model in Prussia (now Germany), which later became the role model for higher education also in North America, went beyond vocational training. In a letter to the Prussian king, he wrote:

The philosopher Julian Nida-Rümelin has criticized discrepancies between Humboldt's ideals and the contemporary European education policy, which narrowly understands education as a preparation for the labor market, arguing that we need to decide between "McKinsey and Humboldt".

Modern usage
The modern use of the term liberal arts consists of four areas: the natural sciences, social sciences, arts, and humanities. Academic areas that are associated with the term liberal arts include:
 Life sciences (biology, ecology, neuroscience)
 Physical science (physics, astronomy, chemistry, geology,physical geography)
 Logic, mathematics, statistics, computer science
 Philosophy
 History
 Social science (anthropology, economics, human geography, linguistics, political science, jurisprudence, psychology, and sociology)
 Creative arts (fine arts, music, performing arts, literature)

For example, the core courses for Georgetown University's Doctor of Liberal Studies program cover philosophy, theology, history, art, literature, and the social sciences. Wesleyan University's Master of Arts in Liberal Studies program includes courses in visual arts, art history, creative and professional writing, literature, history, mathematics, film, government, education, biology, psychology, and astronomy.

Secondary school
Liberal arts education at the secondary school level prepares students for higher education at a university.

Curricula differ from school to school, but generally include language, chemistry, biology, geography, art, mathematics, music, history, philosophy, civics, social sciences, and foreign languages.

In the United States

In the United States, liberal arts colleges are schools emphasizing undergraduate study in the liberal arts. The teaching at liberal arts colleges is often Socratic, typically with small classes; professors are often allowed to concentrate more on their teaching responsibilities than are professors at research universities.

In addition, most four-year colleges are not devoted exclusively or primarily to liberal arts degrees, but offer a liberal arts degree, and allow students not majoring in liberal arts to take courses to satisfy distribution requirements in liberal arts.

Traditionally, a bachelor's degree in one particular area within liberal arts, with substantial study outside that main area, is earned over four years of full-time study. However, some universities such as Saint Leo University, Pennsylvania State University, Florida Institute of Technology, and New England College have begun to offer an associate degree in liberal arts. Colleges like the Thomas More College of Liberal Arts offer a unique program with only one degree offering, a Bachelor of Arts in Liberal Studies, while the Harvard Extension School offers both a Bachelor of Liberal Arts and a Master of Liberal Arts. Additionally, colleges like the University of Oklahoma College of Liberal Studies and the Harvard Extension School offer an online, part-time option for adult and nontraditional students.

Most students earn either a Bachelor of Arts degree or a Bachelor of Science degree; on completing undergraduate study, students might progress to either a liberal arts graduate school or a professional school (public administration, engineering, business, law, medicine, theology).

Great Books movement 

In 1937 St. John's College changed its curriculum to focus on the Great Books of the Western World to provide a new sort of education that separated itself from the increasingly specialized nature of higher schooling.

In Europe

In most parts of Europe, liberal arts education is deeply rooted. In Germany, Austria and countries influenced by their education system it is called 'humanistische Bildung''' (humanistic education). The term is not to be confused with some modern educational concepts that use a similar wording. Educational institutions that see themselves in that tradition are often a Gymnasium (high school, grammar school). They aim at providing their pupils with comprehensive education (Bildung) to form personality with regard to a pupil's own humanity as well as their innate intellectual skills. Going back to the long tradition of the liberal arts in Europe, education in the above sense was freed from scholastic thinking and re-shaped by the theorists of the Enlightenment; in particular, Wilhelm von Humboldt. Since students are considered to have received a comprehensive liberal arts education at gymnasia, very often the role of liberal arts education in undergraduate programs at universities is reduced compared to the US educational system. Students are expected to use their skills received at the gymnasium to further develop their personality in their own responsibility, e.g. in universities' music clubs, theatre groups, language clubs, etc. Universities encourage students to do so and offer respective opportunities but do not make such activities part of the university's curriculum.

Thus, on the level of higher education, despite the European origin of the liberal arts college, the term liberal arts college usually denotes liberal arts colleges in the United States. With the exception of pioneering institutions such as Franklin University Switzerland (formerly known as Franklin College), established as a Europe-based, US-style liberal arts college in 1969, only recently some efforts have been undertaken to systematically "re-import" liberal arts education to continental Europe, as with Leiden University College The Hague, University College Utrecht, University College Maastricht, Amsterdam University College, Roosevelt Academy (now University College Roosevelt), University College Twente (ATLAS), Erasmus University College, the University of Groningen, Bratislava International School of Liberal Arts, Leuphana University of Lüneburg, Central European University, and Bard College Berlin, formerly known as the European College of Liberal Arts. Central European University launched a liberal arts undergraduate degree in Culture, Politics, and Society  in 2020 as part of its move to Vienna and accreditation in Austria. As well as the colleges listed above, some universities in the Netherlands offer bachelors programs in Liberal Arts and Sciences (Tilburg University). Liberal arts (as a degree program) is just beginning to establish itself in Europe. For example, University College Dublin offers the degree, as does St. Marys University College Belfast, both institutions coincidentally on the island of Ireland. In the Netherlands, universities have opened constituent liberal arts colleges under the terminology university college since the late 1990s. The four-year bachelor's degree in Liberal Arts and Sciences at University College Freiburg is the first of its kind in Germany. It started in October 2012 with 78 students. The first Liberal Arts degree program in Sweden was established at Gothenburg University in 2011, followed by a Liberal Arts Bachelor Programme at Uppsala University's Campus Gotland in the autumn of 2013. The first Liberal Arts program in Georgia was introduced in 2005 by American-Georgian Initiative for Liberal Education (AGILE), an NGO. Thanks to their collaboration, Ilia State University became the first higher education institution in Georgia to establish a liberal arts program.

In France, Chavagnes Studium, a Liberal Arts Study Centre in partnership with the Institut Catholique d'études supérieures, and based in a former Catholic seminary, is launching a two-year intensive BA in the Liberal Arts, with a distinctively Catholic outlook. It has been suggested that the liberal arts degree may become part of mainstream education provision in the United Kingdom, Ireland and other European countries. In 1999, the European College of Liberal Arts (now Bard College Berlin) was founded in Berlin and in 2009 it introduced a four-year Bachelor of Arts program in Value Studies taught in English, leading to an interdisciplinary degree in the humanities.

In England, the first institution to retrieve and update a liberal arts education at the undergraduate level was the University of Winchester with their BA (Hons) Modern Liberal Arts programme which launched in 2010. In 2012, University College London began its interdisciplinary Arts and Sciences BASc degree (which has kinship with the liberal arts model) with 80 students. In 2013, the University of Birmingham created the School of Liberal Arts and Natural Sciences, home of a suite of flexible 4-year programmes in which students study a broad range of subjects drawn from across the University, and gain qualifications including both traditional Liberal Arts and Natural Sciences, but also novel thematic combinations linking both areas. King's College London launched the BA Liberal Arts, which has a slant towards arts, humanities and social sciences subjects. The New College of the Humanities also launched a new liberal education programme. Richmond American University London is a private liberal arts university where all undergraduate degrees are taught with a US liberal arts approach over a four year programme. Durham University has both a popular BA Liberal Arts and a BA Combined Honours in Social Sciences programme, both of which allow for interdisciplinary approaches to education. The University of Nottingham also has a Liberal Arts BA with study abroad options and links with its Natural Sciences degrees. In 2016, the University of Warwick launched a three/four-year liberal arts BA degree, which focuses on transdisciplinary approaches and problem-based learning techniques in addition to providing structured disciplinary routes and bespoke pathways. And for 2017 entry UCAS lists 20 providers of liberal arts programmes.

In Scotland, the four-year undergraduate Honours degree, specifically the Master of Arts, has historically demonstrated considerable breadth in focus. In the first two years of Scottish MA and BA degrees students typically study a number of different subjects before specialising in their Honours years (third and fourth year). The University of Dundee and the University of Glasgow (at its Crichton Campus) are the only Scottish universities that currently offer a specifically named 'Liberal Arts' degree.

In Slovakia, the Bratislava International School of Liberal Arts (BISLA) is located in the Old Town of Bratislava. It is the first liberal arts college in Central Europe. A private, accredited three-year degree-granting undergraduate institution, it opened in September 2006.

In Asia

The Commission on Higher Education of the Philippines mandates a General Education curriculum required of all higher education institutions; it includes a number of liberal arts subjects, including history, art appreciation, and ethics, plus interdisciplinary electives. Many universities have much more robust liberal arts core curricula; most notably, the Jesuit universities such as Ateneo de Manila University have a strong liberal arts core curriculum that includes philosophy, theology, literature, history, and the social sciences. Forman Christian College is a liberal arts university in Lahore, Pakistan. It is one of the oldest institutions in the Indian subcontinent. It is a chartered university recognized by the Higher Education Commission of Pakistan. Habib University in Karachi, Pakistan offers a holistic liberal arts and sciences experience to its students through its uniquely tailored liberal core program which is compulsory for all undergraduate degree students. The Underwood International College of Yonsei University, Korea, has compulsory liberal arts courses for all the student body.

In India, there are many institutions that offer undergraduate UG or bachelor's degree/diploma and postgraduate PG or master's degree/diploma as well as doctoral PhD and postdoctoral studies and research, in this academic discipline. The highly ranked IIT Guwahati offers a  Manipal Academy of Higher Education – MAHE, an Institution of Eminence as recognised by MHRD of Govt of India in 2018, houses a Faculty of Liberal Arts, Humanities and Social Sciences, and also others like Symbiosis & FLAME University in Pune, Ahmedabad University, and Pandit Deendayal Energy University (PDEU)  in Ahmedabad, Ashoka University, and Azim Premji University in Bangalore. Lingnan University, Asian University for Women and University of Liberal Arts- Bangladesh (ULAB) are also a few such liberal arts colleges in Asia. International Christian University in Tokyo is the first and one of the very few liberal arts universities in Japan. Fulbright University Vietnam is the first liberal arts institution in Vietnam.

In Australia
Campion College is a Roman Catholic dedicated liberal arts college, located in the western suburbs of Sydney. Founded in 2006, it is the first tertiary educational liberal arts college of its type in Australia. Campion offers a Bachelor of Arts in the Liberal Arts as its sole undergraduate degree. The key disciplines studied are history, literature, philosophy, and theology.

The Millis Institute is the School of Liberal Arts at Christian Heritage College located in Brisbane. Founded by Dr. Ryan Messmore, former President of Campion College, the Millis Institute offers a Bachelor of Arts in the Liberal Arts in which students can choose to major in Philosophy, Theology, History or Literature. It also endorses a 'Study Abroad' program whereby students can earn credit towards their degree by undertaking two units over a five-week program at the University of Oxford. As of 2022, Elizabeth Hillman is currently the President of the Millis Institute.

A new school of Liberal Arts has been formed in the University of Wollongong; the new Arts course entitled 'Western Civilisation' was first offered in 2020. The interdisciplinary curriculum focuses on the classic intellectual and artistic literature of the Western tradition. Courses in the liberal arts have recently been developed at the University of Sydney and the University of Notre Dame.

See also

 Citations 

 General and cited references 
 
 
 
 Kimball, Bruce A. Orators and Philosophers: A History of the Idea of Liberal Education. College Board, 1995.
 
 
 
 
 
 

Further reading
 
 Barzun, Jacques. The House of Intellect, Reprint Harper Perennial, 2002.
 Blaich, Charles, Anne Bost, Ed Chan, and Richard Lynch. "Defining Liberal Arts Education." Center of Inquiry in the Liberal Arts, 2004.
 Blanshard, Brand. The Uses of a Liberal Education: And Other Talks to Students. (Open Court, 1973. )
 Friedlander, Jack. Measuring the Benefits of Liberal Arts Education in Washington's Community Colleges. Los Angeles: Center for the Study of Community Colleges, 1982a. (ED 217 918)
 Grafton Anthony and Lisa Jardine. From Humanism to the Humanities: The Institutionalizing of the Liberal Arts in Fifteenth- and Sixteenth-century Europe, Harvard University Press, 1987.
 Guitton, Jean. A Student's Guide to Intellectual Work, The University of Notre Dame Press, 1964.
 Highet, Gilbert. The Art of Teaching, Vintage Books, 1950.
 Joseph, Sister Miriam. The Trivium: The Liberal Arts of Logic, Grammar, and Rhetoric. Paul Dry Books Inc, 2002.
 Kimball, Bruce A. The Liberal Arts Tradition: A Documentary History. University Press Of America, 2010.
 
 McGrath, Charles. "What Every Student Should Know", New York Times, 8 January 2006.
 Parker, H. "The Seven Liberal Arts," The English Historical Review, Vol. V, 1890.
 
 
 Ruckdeschel, Christopher. On the Nature of the Classical Liberal Arts, Bookbaby, 2019.
 Saint-Victor, Hugh of. The Didascalicon, Columbia University Press, 1961.
 Schall, James V. Another Sort of Learning, Ignatius Press, 1988.
 
 Sertillanges, A. G. The Intellectual Life, The Catholic University of America Press, 1998.
 Tubbs, N. (2011) "Know Thyself: Macrocosm and Microcosm" in Studies in Philosophy and Education Volume 30 no.1
 Winterer, Caroline. The Culture of Classicism: Ancient Greece and Rome in American Intellectual Life, 1780–1910. Baltimore: Johns Hopkins University Press, 2002.
 Wriston, Henry M. The Nature of a Liberal College. Lawrence University Press, 1937.
 Zakaria, Fareed. In Defense of a Liberal Education. New York: W.W. Norton & Company, 2015.

External links

  Definition and short history of the Seven Liberal Arts from 1905.
 Fr. Herve de la Tour, "The Seven Liberal Arts", Edocere, a Resource for Catholic Education, February 2002. Thomas Aquinas's definition of and justification for a liberal arts education.
 Otto Willmann. "The Seven Liberal Arts". In The Catholic Encyclopedia. New York: Robert Appleton Company, 1907. Retrieved 13 August 2012.] "[Renaissance] Humanists, over-fond of change, unjustly condemned the system of the seven liberal arts as barbarous. It is no more barbarous than the Gothic style, a name intended to be a reproach. The Gothic, built up on the conception of the old basilica, ancient in origin, yet Christian in character, was misjudged by the Renaissance on account of some excrescences, and obscured by the additions engrafted upon it by modern lack of taste… That the achievements of our forefathers should be understood, recognized, and adapted to our own needs, is surely to be desired."
 Andrew Chrucky (1 September 2003). "The Aim of Liberal Education". "The content of a liberal education should be moral problems as provided by history, anthropology, sociology, economics, and politics. And these should be discussed along with a reflection on the nature of morality and the nature of discussions, i.e., through a study of rhetoric and logic. Since discussion takes place in language, an effort should be made to develop a facility with language."
 "Philosophy of Liberal Education" A bibliography, compiled by Andrew Chrucky, with links to essays offering different points of view on the meaning of a liberal education.
 Mark Peltz, "The Liberal Arts and Leadership", College News (The Annapolis Group), 14 May 2012. A defense of liberal education by the Associate Dean of Grinnell College (first appeared in Inside Higher Ed).
 "Liberal Arts at the Community College", an ERIC Fact Sheet. ERIC Clearinghouse for Junior Colleges Los Angeles
 "A Descriptive Analysis of the Community College Liberal Arts Curriculum". ERIC Clearinghouse for Junior Colleges Los Angeles
 The Center of Inquiry in the Liberal Arts. Website about The Wabash Study (for improving liberal education). Sponsored by the Center of Inquiry in the Liberal Arts at Wabash College (Indiana), the Wabash Study began in the fall of 2010 – scheduled to end in 2013. Participants include 29 prominent colleges and universities.
 Academic Commons. An online platform in support of the liberal education community. It is a forum for sharing practices, outcomes, and lessons learned of online learning. Formerly sponsored by the Center of Inquiry in the Liberal Arts, The Academic Commons is hosted by the National Institute for Technology in Liberal Education ("NITLE".).
 The Liberal Arts Advantage – for Business. Website dedicated to "Bridging the gap between business and the liberal arts". "A liberal arts education is aimed at developing the ability to think, reason, analyze, decide, discern, and evaluate. That's in contrast to a professional or technical education (business, engineering, computer science, etc.) which develops specific abilities aimed at preparing students for vocations."
 Video explanation by Professor Nigel Tubbs of liberal arts curriculum and degree requirements of Winchester University, UK.. "Liberal arts education (Latin: liberalis, free, and ars'', art or principled practice) involves us in thinking philosophically across many subject boundaries in the humanities, the social and natural sciences, and fine arts. The degree combines compulsory modules covering art, religion, literature, science and the history of ideas with a wide range of optional modules. This enables students to have flexibility and control over their programme of study and the content of their assessments."